The Ethiopian large-eared roundleaf bat (Hipposideros megalotis) is a species of bat in the family Hipposideridae. It is found in Djibouti, Eritrea, Ethiopia, Kenya, Saudi Arabia, and Somalia. Its natural habitats are dry savanna, subtropical or tropical dry shrubland, caves, and hot deserts.

Taxonomy and etymology
It was described as a new species in 1862 by German ornithologist Theodor von Heuglin. Von Heuglin placed it in the now-defunct genus Phyllorrhina (misspelling of Phyllorhina), with a scientific name of Phyllorrhina megalotis.
Its species name "megalotis" means "long-eared."

Biology and range
It is nocturnal, roosting in sheltered places during the day such as man-made structures. It also possibly uses caves for roosts. It has been found in Djibouti, Eritrea, Ethiopia, Kenya, and Saudi Arabia.

Conservation
It is currently assessed as least concern by the IUCN—its lowest conservation priority.

References

Hipposideros
Mammals described in 1862
Bats of Africa
Taxonomy articles created by Polbot